Fingersmith may refer to:

 Fingersmith (slang), slang for a midwife or pickpocket
 Fingersmith (novel), a 2002 crime fiction novel by Sarah Waters
 Fingersmith (TV serial), a 2005 BBC mini-series based on the novel

See also
 Finger (disambiguation)
 Smith (disambiguation)